This is a listing of the horses that finished in either first, second, or third place and the number of starters in The Federico Tesio Stakes, an American stakes race for three-year-olds at 1-1/8 miles on dirt held at either Laurel Park in Laurel, Maryland or Pimlico Race Course in Baltimore, Maryland.  (List 1973-present)

See also 

 Federico Tesio Stakes
 Pimlico Race Course
 List of graded stakes at Pimlico Race Course

References

 The Federico Tesio Stakes at Pedigree Query
 The 2007 Federico Tesio Stakes at Thoroughbred Times 

Previously graded stakes races in the United States
Flat horse races for three-year-olds
Triple Crown Prep Races
Pimlico Race Course
Horse races in Maryland